Panic Button Records was a record label which was formed in Chicago, Illinois in 1997. It was co-owned by Ben Weasel and John Jughead, both members of punk rock band Screeching Weasel. In 1998 the label was purchased by Lookout! Records when Screeching Weasel re-signed to Lookout!.

Former Artists
Common Rider
The Dollyrots
The Eyeliners
Enemy You
Even in Blackouts
The Jackie Papers
The Jimmies
The Lillingtons
Moral Crux
Screeching Weasel
The Wanna-Bes
Ben Weasel
Yesterday's Kids
Zero Boys

References

See also
 List of record labels

American record labels
Record labels established in 1997
Punk record labels